Dagny Mellgren Haugland (born 19 June 1978) from Ålgård is a former Norwegian footballer. She retired in December 2005 while playing for Klepp. She has also played for Boston Breakers, in the WUSA. She scored the golden goal in the final against the United States at the 2000 Summer Olympics, winning the gold medal for Norway. She retired from football in December 2005.

Personal life
Mellgren and her partner Gert Haugland had a child in September 2006.

References

1978 births
Living people
Sportspeople from Stavanger
Norwegian women's footballers
Norway women's international footballers
Women's association football forwards
Footballers at the 2000 Summer Olympics
Olympic gold medalists for Norway
Olympic footballers of Norway
Boston Breakers (WUSA) players
Women's United Soccer Association players
Expatriate women's soccer players in the United States
Toppserien players
Klepp IL players
Arna-Bjørnar players
Olympic medalists in football
Medalists at the 2000 Summer Olympics
2003 FIFA Women's World Cup players
1999 FIFA Women's World Cup players
People from Gjesdal
Sportspeople from Rogaland